{{Speciesbox
| image = Tropidurus_erythrocephalus_244091237.jpeg
| status = VU
| status_system = IUCN3.1
| status_ref = <ref name="iucn status 11 November 2021">{{cite iucn |authors=Silveira, A.L., da Rocha, C., Nogueira, C. de C., Werneck, F., de Moura, G.J.B., Winck, G., Ribeiro Júnior, M.A., Kiefer, M., de Freitas, M.A., Hoogmoed, M.S., Tinôco, M.S.T., Valadão, R., Cardoso Vieira, R., Perez Maciel, R., Gomes Faria, R., Recoder, R., D'Ávila, R., Torquato da Silva, S., de Barcelos Ribeiro, S. & Avila-Pires, T.C.S.|date=2021 |title='Tropidurus erythrocephalus |volume=2021|page=e.T178594A159254968 |url=https://www.iucnredlist.org/species/178594/159254968 |access-date=16 December 2021}}</ref> 
| genus = Tropidurus
| species = erythrocephalus
| authority = Rodrigues, 1987
}}Tropidurus erythrocephalus'' is a species of lizard of the Tropiduridae family. It is found in Brazil.

References

Tropidurus
Reptiles described in 1987
Endemic fauna of Brazil
Reptiles of Brazil
Taxa named by Miguel Trefaut Rodrigues